WM Recordings is a Heerlen, the Netherlands based record label founded in 2004, by Marco Kalnenek, who was also involved with Comfort Stand Recordings. 
Kalnenek also is the webmaster of Weirdomusic.com, a website nominated for a Webby Award in 2004.

WM Recordings focuses on music that is, in their own words, "a little different".
They do not specialize in one style, but release anything from free jazz to experimental soundscapes, world music and other styles that are often neglected by other netlabels.

In 2007, WM Recordings started adding commercial releases to their catalog. These are available from most major download stores. 
August 2008 saw the release of their first physical CD: "Handle With Care - Might Panic" by Danish band Panicphobia.

See also
 List of record labels

References

External links
 Official site

Dutch independent record labels
Netlabels
Record labels established in 2004
Experimental music record labels
World music record labels
Companies based in Limburg (Netherlands)
Music in Limburg (Netherlands)
Heerlen
Online music stores of the Netherlands